Hauman is a surname. Notable people with the surname include:

Constance Hauman (born 1961), soprano
George and Doris Hauman, illustrators of children's books
Glenn Hauman (born 1969), American writer, editor, publisher and comic book colorist
Lucien Leon Hauman (1880–1965), botanist and an author